Sir Robert Paterson Houston, 1st Baronet (31 May 1853 – 14 April 1926) was a British Conservative Party politician and shipowner.

He was born to a maritime engineer from Renfrewshire, and, after an apprenticeship in Liverpool, Houston also became an engineer. In 1877 he bought a share in a packet steamer with his inheritance, using the profits to start up his own management company in 1880, R.P. Houston & Company. Clan Line acquired R.P. Houston & Company in 1918.

In 1892 he was elected as member of parliament (MP) for Liverpool West Toxteth, resigning on 26 April 1924 through appointment as Steward of the Chiltern Hundreds. He was created a Baronet, of West Toxteth in the City of Liverpool, in 1922.

In 1924 he married Lucy, Lady Byron, widow of the 9th baron, who then became Lady Houston. Research published in 2020 outlined her seven-year pursuit of him. In his will, he left his wife the bulk of his fortune. When he died on his steam yacht Liberty on 14 April 1926, she became the second richest woman in England.

Using Houston's money his widow funded the first flight over Mount Everest and the development of the later-to-be-famous Supermarine Spitfire aircraft. She then purchased a weekly journal, the Saturday Review, in which she pursued a right-wing agenda to promote the strength of Britain and the Empire.

References

External links 
 

1853 births
1926 deaths
Baronets in the Baronetage of the United Kingdom
Conservative Party (UK) MPs for English constituencies
UK MPs 1892–1895
UK MPs 1895–1900
UK MPs 1900–1906
UK MPs 1906–1910
UK MPs 1910
UK MPs 1910–1918
UK MPs 1918–1922
UK MPs 1922–1923
UK MPs 1923–1924
English businesspeople
British businesspeople in shipping